Kevin Toliver II (born November 24, 1995) is an American football cornerback for the Indianapolis Colts of the National Football League (NFL). He played college football at LSU, and was signed by the Colts as a free agent in 2023.

Early years
Toliver attended Trinity Christian Academy in Jacksonville, Florida. In high school he played quarterback and cornerback for Trinity Christian.
He committed to play football for the LSU Tigers on November 5, 2012, as a sophomore in high school.

College career
As a true freshman in 2015, Toliver played in all 12 of LSU's games, tallying 35 tackles, one interception, and five pass deflections.

In 2016, as a sophomore, Toliver only played in seven games, missing the last five games due to a shoulder injury. In those seven games, he made 21 total tackles.

As a junior in 2017, Toliver played in 12 of LSU's 13 games, missing only their season opener against BYU. In 12 games, he compiled 28 tackles, one interception, one sack, two forced fumbles and 10 pass deflections. On January 8, 2018, Toliver announced that he would forgo his senior year in an effort to pursue a career in the NFL.

Professional career

Chicago Bears
Toliver signed with the Chicago Bears as an undrafted free agent on May 10, 2018. Toliver made his first NFL start on September 30, 2018 against the Tampa Bay Buccaneers and recorded 7 tackles.

On September 5, 2020, Toliver was waived by the Bears.

Denver Broncos
On September 8, 2020, Toliver was signed to the Denver Broncos practice squad. He was elevated to the active roster on September 26, 2020, for the team's week 3 game against the Tampa Bay Buccaneers, and reverted to the practice squad after the game. He was signed to the active roster on November 5, 2020. He was placed on injured reserve on December 16, 2020. He was released on January 4, 2021.

Baltimore Ravens
On November 23, 2021, Toliver was signed to the Baltimore Ravens practice squad. He signed a reserve/future contract with the Ravens on January 10, 2022. He was waived on May 26.

Indianapolis Colts
On February 22, 2023, Toliver signed with the Indianapolis Colts.

NFL Career statistics

References

External links
LSU Tigers bio

1995 births
Living people
Players of American football from Jacksonville, Florida
American football cornerbacks
LSU Tigers football players
Chicago Bears players
Denver Broncos players
Baltimore Ravens players
Indianapolis Colts players